The Edgar Kaplan Blue Ribbon Pairs (or simply the Blue Ribbon Pairs) is a national bridge championship held at the fall American Contract Bridge League (ACBL) North American Bridge Championship (NABC). The event is restricted to those that have won a blue ribbon qualification (usually by placing in the top two of an unrestricted regional event) and is generally considered, with the Norman Kay Platinum Pairs, as one of the two hardest pairs event on the ACBL calendar.

The Blue Ribbon Pairs is a six session MP pairs event, two qualifying sessions, two semi-final sessions and two final sessions that takes place over three days, typically starting on the first Tuesday of the NABC.

Along with the Von Zedtwitz Life Master Pairs at the summer NABC and the Norman Kay Platinum Pairs at the spring NABC, the events provide one marquee pairs championship at each of the three NABCs. Each is open to all players whose past performances qualify them, without regard to age, gender, nationality, or ACBL membership. In addition, the North American Pairs, contested in the spring, is for ACBL members who have qualified in one of its 25 Districts, some of which require qualification in local Units.

History

The event was introduced in 1963 and ranks with the von Zedtwitz Life Master Pairs (Summer NABC) as the most prestigious—and toughest—pair events on the ACBL calendar.

Entry is restricted to winners and runners-up in regional championships—plus high finishers in North American championships, members of current Grand National district championship teams, members of current official teams representing ACBL and the top 100 lifetime masterpoint holders.

The Blue Ribbon Pairs was renamed the Edgar Kaplan Blue Ribbon Pairs in 1999 to honor one of bridge's all-time great players, writers and administrators. Edgar Kaplan was recognized as the world’s foremost authority on the laws of duplicate and rubber bridge. He became co-chairman of the ACBL Laws Commission in 1978 and was co-chairman of the WBF Laws Commission at the time of his death. He was named ACBL Honorary Member in 1993. In 1995 he was inducted into the ACBL Bridge Hall of Fame and the WBF Hall of Fame.

The event is contested for the Cavendish Trophy, which was donated by the Cavendish Club of New York in 1928 and long awarded for the National Open Pairs. Since 1963, the trophy has been awarded to winners of the Blue Ribbon Pairs.

Winners

No Blue Ribbon Pairs champion has successfully defended its title. Jeff Meckstroth and Eric Rodwell have won three times as a pair; two other pairs have won twice: Steve Robinson–Kit Woolsey and Marty Bergen–Larry N. Cohen. Bob Hamman won four times with four partners over thirty years from 1964 to 1993; Cohen (twice), Rodwell (once) and Woolsey (once) won additional titles with other partners.  They and Meckstroth are the only players with three or more wins.

Kathie and Mike Cappelletti were runners-up in 1973 and 1977. A married couple last won the predecessor Fall National Open Pairs in 1945, Jane and Lewis M. Jaeger (the first married couple who became Life Masters).

Two women, Daniela von Arnim and Sabine Auken were runners-up in 2005—the last time there was one woman in the winning pair, Jenny Ryman and Gavin Wolpert (who later married). Two women won the predecessor Open Pairs in 1948, Helen Sobel and Margaret Wagar—also the last time any pair defended its title.

See also
Fall National Open Pairs, predecessor 1928 to 1962
Von Zedtwitz Life Master Pairs, or simply Life Master Pairs
Norman Kay Platinum Pairs, or Platinum Pairs

Sources

 Pre-2008 winners:
 2008 winners 
 Qualification rules: 
 The ACBL official website: go to the 'Tournaments' tab, then the 'NABC Winners' tab; select a "Fall" and/or "[Year]" NABC. Look for 'Kaplan Blue Ribbon Pairs' under the 'Event' column.  Retrieved 2015-11-16.

References

External links
 "Blue Ribbon Pairs – A Look Back". November 12, 2013. ACBL. Retrieved 2014-06-06.

North American Bridge Championships